Arthur Collins (born April 14, 1954) is a retired American basketball player. He played collegiately for St. Thomas University.

Collins was selected by the Boston Celtics in the 6th round (103rd pick overall) of the 1976 NBA Draft. He played for the Atlanta Hawks (1980–81) in the NBA for 29 games.

Honors

Club
Parker Leiden
Eredivisie: (1978)

Individual
Eredivisie Most Valuable Player: (1978)
All-Eredivisie First-Team: (1978, 1979)

External links 
 

1954 births
Living people
American expatriate basketball people in the Netherlands
American men's basketball players
Atlanta Hawks players
Barry Buccaneers men's basketball coaches
Basketball players from Georgia (U.S. state)
Boston Celtics draft picks
B.S. Leiden players
People from Sandersville, Georgia
Shooting guards
St. Thomas Bobcats men's basketball players

Flamingo's Haarlem players
Dutch Basketball League players